Thattankulam is one of the villages in Tirunelveli district  in the Indian state of Tamil Nadu.

Geography
It has an average elevation of 141 metres (462 feet).

Administration
Thattankulam is governed by the South Nanguneri Village Panchayat. Thattankulam is part of Nanguneri assembly constituency and Tirunelveli parliamentary constituency. Nanguneri police station, part of Tamil Nadu Police maintain law and order in Thattankulam.

Transport
Thattankulam is located 4 km away from Nanguneri on Nanguneri to Ovari State Highway 89. The National Highway 7 is 3 km away and can be reached through SH 89.

The Tamil Nadu State Transport Corporation operates daily services connecting Tirunelveli – Thisayanvilai. Private Transport Corporation also operates daily services connecting Tirunelveli - Thisayanvilai, and Thisayanvilai - Kalakkad. All Private buses have stop at Thattankkulam. Except Tirunelveli – Thisayanvilai End to End all other TNSTC buses have stop at Thattankulam.

The nearest railway station is located at Nanguneri just 4 km away.

C.S.I Christ Church

This church is a part of Tirunelveli Diocese. On a Sunday morning there is Service at 9:00 am. Holy Communion is on the first Sunday of evening month at 11:00 am. Evening service is at 7:00 pm on every week days.

Notes

References 
 http://tnmaps.tn.nic.in/district.php Nanguneri Taluk Map

Cities and towns in Tirunelveli district